Air Venture Tours was a private charter airline based in Guatemala La Aurora International Airport.  It mainly operates charter flights throughout the Maya World to touristic destinations such as Tikal, Copan, Palenque, Bay Islands at Honduras.  Specialized in high-end tourism.

Fleet
The Air Venture Tours fleet includes

Cessna Grand Caravan
Pilatus PC-12
Embraer 110
DeHavilland Twin Otter
Bell 206

Destinations
 Charter flights to airstrips throughout Honduras, El Salvador and Guatemala.
Arqueological sites, fishing, golf, adventure and mayan culture destinations.

References 

Defunct airlines of Guatemala
Privately held companies